= Lonny B. Winrich =

American politician

Member of the North Dakota House of Representatives
- In office 1999–2004
- In office 2009–2012

Personal details
- Born: 1937 (age 88–89)
- Party: Democratic
- Education: University of Wisconsin–Eau Claire; University of Wyoming; Iowa State University

Lonny B. Winrich (born 1937) is an American politician. He served as a Democratic member of the North Dakota House of Representatives.

== Life and career ==
Winrich attended the University of Wisconsin–Eau Claire, the University of Wyoming and Iowa State University.

Winrich served in the North Dakota House of Representatives from 1999 to 2004 and again from 2009 to 2012.
